Miskolci may refer to
Miskolc, a city in Hungary
Miskolci AK, a Hungarian football club based in Miskolc
Miskolci VSC, a Hungarian football club based in Miskolc
Miskolci VLC, a Hungarian water polo club based in Miskolc
Richard Miskolci, Brazilian sociologist